The Princess Weiyoung is a 2016 Chinese television series starring Tiffany Tang in the title role, alongside Luo Jin, Vanness Wu, Mao Xiaotong and Li Xinai. It is adapted from the novel The Poisonous Daughter by Qin Jian and is a fictionalized account of Emperor Wencheng of Northern Wei's reign and Empress Dowager Feng's regency. The series aired on Dragon TV and Beijing TV from November 11 to December 9, 2016.

The series received mixed reviews. It was praised for its tight plot and fast storyline and vivid character personas. It was also praised for showcasing the story of growth of a strong and independent female lead, as well as fleshing out the background stories of various supporting characters. Viewership ratings also reached as high as 2%, making it one of the highest rated drama of 2016. However it was criticized for its cliché plot devices, illogical plot details, use of excessive and inappropriate makeup, and dubbing of actors' voices. Investigations and a lawsuit showed that the original novel was heavily plagiarized from other similar stories. However, the series was nominated for several awards, winning actor & actress awards for both Luo Jin and Tiffany Tang, and Best Chinese Language Drama award at the 5th Annual DramaFever Awards.

Its spin-off sequel, The Song of Glory, was aired in July 2020.

Synopsis 
During the chaotic Northern and Southern Dynasties, among Northern Liang's royal family lived a princess named Feng Xin'er (Tiffany Tang) who was kind, carefree and loved by all. Chiyun Nan, a marshal from the Chiyun clan of Northern Wei, was driven by greed to overrun Northern Liang and turned it into a bloodbath, killing almost the entire royal family and forcing the princess to survive on her own.

Li Weiyoung, the daughter of the Prime Minister of Northern Wei and his seventh concubine, shielded the princess from harm. However, Weiyoung was killed by the Chiyun family, of which the Prime Minister's first wife, Chiyun Rou, was a member, who were not pleased when she was recalled to the Prime Minister's manor. Xin'er assumed Weiyoung's identity and resided in the manor, where she was disliked and shunned by her older half-sister Li Changle and her mother Chiyun Rou. She thus took it upon herself to fight against the Chiyun clan and became entangled with Northern Wei's prince, Tuoba Jun (Luo Jin). She also attracted the eye of Tuoba Yu (Vanness Wu) who saw her as a chess piece to his ultimate aim of being Emperor. Through her struggles, she gained wisdom and was finally able to find peace for her family while living true to her heart.

Cast

Main 

 Tiffany Tang as Li Weiyoung / Feng Xin'er
 Kind, bright and intelligent, she seeks to investigate the truth after her kingdom is destroyed and her family is assassinated. Being, in reality, the princess of Northern Liang, she assumed her friend Weiyoung's identity as the illegitimate daughter of Prime Minister Li, in order to be able to avenge her own family as well as Weiyoung. In the process she falls in love with the Emperor's grandson without knowing his status at first, then tries to rebuff him when she realizes who he is. In the end, Weiyoung becomes Tuoba Jun's wife, and bears him a son. After Tuoba Jun's death five years after the events in the drama, she becomes  the Empress Dowager with their young son ascending the throne.
 Luo Jin as Tuoba Jun, Prince Gaoyang
 Bright, sunny and compassionate, Tuoba Jun is the Emperor's favorite grandson as well as the deceased Crown Prince's son. As a result, he is targeted by the Emperor's sons, Tuoba Han and Tuoba Yu. However, he doesn't care about royal politics. His sincerity and unwavering love towards Weiyoung, despite her desire for revenge, makes her fall for him. In the end, he finally becomes Weiyoung's husband and together they have a son, and Tuoba Jun ascends the throne as Emperor. Tuoba Jun eventually dies from an illness five years after the events in the drama.
 Vanness Wu as Tuoba Yu, Prince Nan'an
Huang Tianqi as young Tuoba Yu
Huang Haige as baby Tuoba Yu
 Cunning, ruthless and cold-blooded, Tuoba Yu's greatest ambition is to become the Emperor and rule the world. He is attracted by Weiyoung's intelligence and wit, and plans to use her as a chess piece to realize his ambitions. However, he soon falls for her, and is willing to go to extreme lengths to have her by his side.
 Mao Xiaotong as Li Changru, Daughter of the 2nd aunt of the Li Family. Weiyoung's younger cousin. 
 She has been in love with Tuoba Yu since she was young. Having been oppressed and overshadowed by her elder cousin Li Changle from a young age, she becomes ruthless and seeks to topple her cousin. She hides her hypocritical and scheming nature behind her weak and delicate appearance. She treats Weiyoung sincerely at first, but turns against her when she discovers that Tuoba Yu has fallen for her, and as a result she betrays Weiyoung. She eventually becomes pregnant with Tuoba Yu's child. Near the end of the series, Changru tries to kill Weiyoung but manages to kill Tuoba Yu. She then kills herself out of misery for inadvertently causing Tuoba Yu's death.
 Li Xin'ai as Li Changle, Daughter of Chiyun Rou and Li Xiaoran. Wei yang's older half-sister. 
 Known as the #1 beauty in the capital province, she is arrogant and selfish, believing that no woman is better than her. The appearance of Li Weiyoung makes her insecure and jealous. She seeks to get rid of Weiyoung and marry Tuoba Jun on whom she has had a crush for a long time. After she frames Li Weiyoung for the death of the Crown Princess (Tuoba Jun's mother), she eventually becomes the wife of Tuoba Jun.  When it is discovered that she is the real murderer, she has to kill herself as punishment.

Supporting

Northern Wei

People in palace

 Canti Lau as Tuoba Tao, Emperor Taiwu of Northern Wei. He was betrayed by Zong Ai at the end.
 Wan Meixi as Empress of Northern Wei
 Ding Ziling as Lu Zhaoyi
 Tuoba Tao's concubine and Tuoba Yu's mother.
 Wang Yujing as Tuoba Huang, former Crown Prince. 
 Tuoba Jun's deceased father. He was framed by Zong Ai as well as Tuoba Yu, imprisoned by the Emperor, and dies of acute illness shortly after.
 Xu Rongzhen as Crown Princess, Tuoba Jun's mother, died after Changle stabbed her with a hairpin.
 Zhang Tianyang as Tuoba Han, Prince of Dongping
 He tries to murder Tuoba Jun on the hunting grounds by setting a hidden trap, which Changle uses as well to get rid of Weiyoung after discovering it. In an attempt to take down Tuoba Yu, whom he sees as a threat in his ambitions to become the successor, Tuoba Han frames Weiyoung for attempting to poison the Empress. When the truth of all his schemes and the collusion with local authorities to enclose lands for personal gains is exposed, the Emperor is about to have him and those involved executed, but instead he is banished as a civilian and confined in his own manor.
 Chen Yuqi as Tuoba Di, Ninth Princess (Princess Shanggu)
 She initially dresses as a man to make fun of Li Minde, thinking he is the one who wants her hand in marriage. After learning archery and spending time with him, she falls in love with him. Although her love is initially not reciprocated, she takes it in her stride and continues to help Li Minde protect Weiyoung. In the end, she gets together with Li Minde after nearly losing her life.
 Hou Ruixiang as Zong Ai, The Emperor's personal eunuch.
 He is actually Tuoba Yu's underling, bribed when Tuoba Yu was 13. He is discovered for his betrayal after trying to steal the account record that proved the Crown Prince's innocence. This also results in him killing Emperor Taiwu.
 Meng Fei as Gao Yun
 Official in the royal court. Stood up for Tuoba Jun in court, and pleaded Yu for his innocence. Ultimately submits to Yu, but he still remains loyal to Tuoba Jun. 
 Rui Weihang as Cheng De, Tuoba Jun's subordinate. He likes Jun Tao.
 Wu Hong as Cheng An, Tuoba Yu's subordinate.
 Zhang Yuechi as Jiang Zuo, Tuoba Han's subordinate.
 Guan Shan as Qiu Yi, Personal servant of Crown princess.
 Jiang Zhen as Xiaolinzi
 Liu Fenggang as Physician Liu
 Han Yan as Head Attendant Liang
 Li Jiaxi as Cai Ping, enslaved Liang lady working as a laundress in the royal palace

Li household 

 Wang Liyuan as Old Granny Li, Li Weiyoung's grandmother.
 She is one of the few members of the Li household who continually stands up for and cherishes Weiyoung, even after learning her identity. 
 Bai Fan as Li Xiaoran
 Prime Minister of Northern Wei. Li Weiyoung's father. Abandons her after realizing her true identity. 
 Lily Tien as Chiyun Rou
 First lady of the Li family. Li Xiaoran's wife; Li Minfeng and Li Changle's birth mother. An evil woman from the Chiyun family who conspires to kill Weiyoung so that she will not overshadow Changle and ruin their plans. She dies from poisoning herself in a scheme to get rid of Weiyoung.
 Hu Caihong as Wen Weiyi
 Second lady of the Li Family. Li Changru and Li Changxi's birth mother. Also a cunning and arrogant woman. 
 Wang Wanjuan as Zhou Xuemei
 Third lady of the Li Family. Li Minde's adoptive mother. She is killed by Chiyun Rou, who plotted to deliberately infect her with a highly contagious disease.
 Liu Jie as Seventh Madame
 Li Weiyoung's birth mother. A kind woman, she discovers that Xin'er is not the real Weiyoung but helps keep her secret, and decides to consider Xin'er as her daughter after she confronts her with the truth.
 Nan Fulong as Li Minfeng
 Eldest son of the Li family. He is power-hungry, lustful, and manipulative. He uses Zi Yan to harm Weiyoung, and dumps her after that. He is killed by Jun Tao after an elaborate plot set up by Weiyoung to avenge Zi Yan's death at his hands.
 Li Yixiao as Li Weiyoung (real)
 Second mistress of the Li household. She was thrown out of the Li household as she was born on an inauspicious date. Li Weiyoung saves Feng Xin'er's life and is killed not long after. After Weiyoung's death, Xin'er assumes her identity to avenge both the murder of her father and grandmother, and also Weiyoung herself.
 Peng Doudou as Li Changxi
 Fourth young mistress of the Li family. She likes to eat, and often sucks up to Li Changle.
 Zhou Meiyi as Chun Ming
 Chiyun Rou's accomplice and personal servant.
 Mu Le'en as Bai Zhi
 Li Weiyoung's loyal servant. She later dies at the hands of Li Changru.
 Tian Yixi as Zi Yan
 Li Weiyoung's personal servant. She betrays Weiyoung after being manipulated by Li Minfeng. She becomes pregnant with his child, and ends up in his household where she is mistreated daily by him. She was rescued by Zhou Xuemei, and died in Weiyoung's arms.
 Peng Yingying as Cui'er, Seventh Madame's personal servant.
 Jin Pohan as Rong'er
 Li Changru's loyal servant who is her accomplice in killing Bai Zhi.
 Chang Shixin as Tan Xiang, Li Changle's personal servant.
 Wang Tianhong as Liu Hong, Li Changxi's personal servant.
 Dai Chunrong as Madame Liu, Li Weiyoung's caretaker.
 She mistreats Weiyoung and after her death, agrees to help pass Xin'er off as Weiyoung to prevent her family from being harmed. She later betrays Xin'er and reveals the deception after being threatened by Chiyun Rou.
 Zhu Xingyu as Ping An, Li Minde's subordinate.
 Tan Songmei as Mother Luo, Old Granny Li's personal servant.

Chiyun Household 

 Tang Jiayang as Old Granny Chiyun
 Jin Han as Chiyun Nan
 Great general of Northern Wei. Chiyun Rou's nephew. He plotted and framed King Hexi of Northern Liang for rebellion in order to satisfy his greed. He eventually works for Tuoba Yu after he saves his life.
 Ji Xiaobing as Chiyun Si
 Zhang Shenghao as Chiyun Wei
 Yang Zuqing as Hong Luo
 Chiyun Nan's faithful follower who is in love with him. She is skilled at martial arts and helps Chiyun Rou accomplish her goals as assassin and spy.

Northern Liang 

 Leanne Liu as Queen Dowager
 Feng Xin'er's loving grandmother who sacrifices herself to protect her granddaughter.
 Tan Kai as King Hexi of Northern Liang
 Feng Xin'er's father who was framed for staging a coup and killed by Chiyun Nan.
 Sun Wei as Uncle Ming
 Head of the royal guards. Jun Tao's father. He killed by Chiyun Nan.
 Wang Yanzhi as Jun Tao
 Feng Xin'er's royal bodyguard. She later continues to stay by her side as a confidante, after Xin'er assumed Weiyoung's identity. She likes Cheng De.
 Zhang Hengping as Fortune Teller Monk

Rou Ran  

 Liang Zhenlun as Li Minde / Prince Yuan Lie, Crown Prince of Rou Ran under Tuhezhen Khan
 He was adopted as the second young master of Li Family by Zhou Xuemei. He likes Weiyoung initially, but later falls for Tuoba Di.
 Wang Wei as Princess An Le, Yuan Lie's younger sister.
 Li Ang as General Jiao
 Minister of Rou Ran Kingdom. He secretly trails and protects Li Minde / Yuan Lie.

Soundtrack

Mainland Chinese

Hong Kong

Production
Filming was done at Hengdian World Studios, and other shooting locations such as Xiaoian in the Xiandu Scenic Area in Jinyun County.

Reception

Ratings 

 Highest ratings are marked in red, lowest ratings are marked in blue

Controversy 
The author of the source novel was involved in a plagiarism case, where it was alleged that she used a software to copy over hundreds of other works to write her own novel. An alliance formed by 12 writers, including famed wuxia novelist Woon Swee Oan, joined to sue Qin Jian.
According to Beijing News, a group of volunteers compared The Poisonous Daughter with more than 200 other novels. They found that out of 294 chapters, only nine chapters were original.

On May 8, 2019, the Chaoyang District People's Court has declared Qin Jian guilty of infringing the works of Shen Wenwen, who wrote the novel 身历六帝宠不衰 that The Poisonous Daughter was copied from. Moreover, she must immediately cease sales and distribution of the novel upon the day the sentence is handed down.

Awards and nominations

International broadcast 
 8TV – 21 February 2017 (weekdays, 8:30 p.m.)
 MediaCorp Channel 8 – 3 June 2017 (2 episodes back-to-back every Sat, 10:30 p.m.)
 TVB Jade – 23 January 2017 (weekdays, 7 p.m.)
 Chunghwa TV – 19 December 2016 (weekdays, 10 p.m.)
 GTV Drama – 8 May 2017 (weekdays, 10 p.m.)
 Oh!K – Coming Soon (2 episodes back-to-back every Thursday–Saturday, 6 p.m.)
 ThaiPBS – 13 January 2019 (Sat – Sun 8.15 p.m.)
 NTV7 – 4 June 2019 (weekdays, 1 a.m.)
 Heart of Asia Channel Philippines - 14 March 2022 (Weekdays, 6 a.m ; replays 6pm)

References

External links 
 TVB Official website 

Chinese historical television series
Television shows based on Chinese novels
2016 Chinese television series debuts
2016 Chinese television series endings
Beijing Television original programming
Dragon Television original programming
Television series by Croton Media
Television series set in the Northern and Southern dynasties